Nikkei Tameike Dam is an earthfill dam located in Shiga prefecture in Japan. The dam is used for irrigation. The catchment area of the dam is 0.5 km2. The dam impounds about 4  ha of land when full and can store 382 thousand cubic meters of water. The construction of the dam was started on 1926 and completed in 1944.

References

Dams in Shiga Prefecture
1944 establishments in Japan